The L. D. M. Sweat Memorial Galleries are a series of art galleries that are part of the Portland Museum of Art, which is located in the Arts District of Portland, Maine.

History
The L. D. M. Sweat Memorial Galleries were built in 1911 by Maine architect John Calvin Stevens. They were named to honor Lorenzo De Medici Sweat, the husband of Portland Museum of Art benefactor, Margaret Jane Mussey Sweat (1823–1908). The building was designed to complement the Federal style architecture of the McLellan House, the oldest building of the museum complex.
The McLellan House and Sweat Galleries were closed in 1980 for the construction of the Payson Building. They remained closed until October 5, 2002, after a two-year restoration.

Collection focus
The primary focus is on 19th- and 20th-century American art — sculpture, furniture, decorative arts and paintings, with specific emphasis on a large collection of works by Winslow Homer. As stated by the museum's board, the works of art in the galleries are an attempt to:

... reflect the changing customs, tastes, and concerns of Americans who created, purchased, and commissioned them. In these galleries, you will travel back through the history of art in the United States. The journey begins with works created on the eve of the 20th century that look back to the United States' rich history and forward to the challenges of a new era. These give way to the lush portraits, still lifes, and exotic scenes that represent the height of academic painting in America and the tastes of a cultivated and wealthy leisure class.

Works in collection

The galleries feature many 19th- and 20th-century American artists, including:

 Benjamin Paul Akers
 Hiram Powers
 Franklin Simmons
 Jim Dine
 Marsden Hartley
 Winslow Homer
 Jasper Johns
 Robert Motherwell
 Claes Oldenburg
 Robert Rauschenberg
 Alison Saar
 Andy Warhol
 Andrew Wyeth

Publicity
In 2001, there was an open house at the galleries, where modern artists created works to enhance the gallery collection and yet fit in with the existing art and decor. Artists involved in the project included Jonathan Bailey, Paul D'Amato, Tonee Harbert, Rose Marasco, Tanja Alexia Hollander and Bernard C. Meyers. The first exhibition was new work by Sa Schloff.

The galleries have been featured in the Portland Journal of Antiquities, as well.

References

External links
 Portland Museum of Art

Art museums and galleries in Maine
Museums in Portland, Maine
Art museums established in 1911
1911 establishments in Maine